The 1990–91 SK Rapid Wien season was the 93rd season in club history.

Squad statistics

Fixtures and results

League

Cup

UEFA Cup

References

1990-91 Rapid Wien Season
Rapid